Viktor Ivanovych Khlus (born February 12, 1958) is a retired Ukrainian professional footballer.

He is married to the Olympic champion gymnast Stella Zakharova.

After retiring from professional football, Khlus headed the CSKA sports school which eventually was grandfathered into the Arsenal sports school. In 2004–05 he was a president of the FC Knyazha Shchaslyve.

Honours
 Soviet Top League champion: 1980, 1981, 1985.
 Soviet Top League runner-up: 1982.
 Soviet Cup winner: 1982.

1958 births
Living people
People from Novhorod-Siverskyi
Soviet footballers
Ukrainian footballers
Soviet expatriate footballers
Ukrainian expatriate footballers
Expatriate footballers in Sweden
Soviet Top League players
Allsvenskan players
FC Bukovyna Chernivtsi players
FC Dynamo Kyiv players
FC Chornomorets Odesa players
FC Guria Lanchkhuti players
GAIS players
IF Elfsborg players
Association football forwards
Sportspeople from Chernihiv Oblast